The United Kingdom, designated as Great Britain and Northern Ireland, will compete at the 2022 European Championships in Munich from August 11 to August 22, 2022. In table tennis, the five British competitors were listed as representing England.

Medallists

Competitors
The following is the list of number of competitors in the Championships:

Athletics

Canoe sprint

Men

Women

Qualification Legend: FA = Qualify to final (medal); FB = Qualify to final B (non-medal)

Paracanoeing

Cycling

Track

Sprint

Qualification legend: FA, Gold medal final; FB, Bronze medal final
^^Based on the qualification results, and taking into consideration the short length of the track, it was decided that the teams in the wonen's sprint would compete alone on the track to determine who would compete for the medals based on times.

Keirin

Time trial

Omnium

Pursuit

Qualification legend: FA, Gold medal final; FB, Bronze medal final; OVL, Overlapped

Points race

Scratch race

Elimination race

Madison

BMX

Freestyle Park

Mountain biking

Gymnastics

Great Britain has entered five male and five female athletes.

Men

Team & Individual All-around Finals

Individual Apparatus Finals 

^^ Giarnni Regini-Moran withdrew from the individual vault final in favour of his teammate Jake Jarman.

Women

Team & Individual All-around Finals 

Individual Apparatus Finals

Rowing

Men

Women

Mixed

Sport climbing

Boulder

Lead

Speed

Table tennis

The following five competitors were listed as representing England.

Men
 Tom Jarvis
 Liam Pitchford
 Sam Walker

Women
 Charlotte Bardsley
 Tin-Tin Ho

Singles

Doubles

Triathlon

Men

Women

Mixed

References

2022
Nations at the 2022 European Championships
European Championships